The Wolfson Stadium is a sports stadium in KwaZakele, Ibhayi just outside Port Elizabeth in South Africa.

The regular tenants of the stadium are Zwide United, PE Villagers, St. Cyprian and Sunday Stars amateur rugby clubs.

It was also the home of the now-defunct football team Bay United F.C.

References

Rugby union stadiums in South Africa
Multi-purpose stadiums in South Africa
Sports venues in the Eastern Cape